Visions of Dennis Brown is a 1978 reggae album by Dennis Brown.

Recording
The album was the first to come out of Brown's second stint with producer Joe Gibbs, with whom he would have his breakthrough international success, and the album played a major part in establishing the dominant position of both Brown and Gibbs in late 1970s reggae. The album mixes roots reggae themes such as economic hardship, African oppression, religion, and politics, with lovers rock material ("Love Me Always") and a cover version of Ray Charles' "This Little Girl of Mine". The album was engineered by Errol Thompson and features veteran musicians Bobby Ellis (trumpet), Vin Gordon (trombone), Herman Marquis (alto saxophone), and Tommy McCook (tenor saxophone).

Release history
The album was originally released in 1978 on the Lightning, Laser, and Joe Gibbs labels. It was reissued on JGML in 1980 and issued for the first time on compact disc in 1989 by Shanachie Records. It was reissued in expanded form in 2006 on the Joe Gibbs Europe label, and reissued again in 2007 on the VP Records subsidiary 17 North Parade.

Track listing

Personnel
Vocals: Dennis Brown
Drums: Sly Dunbar
Bass: Lloyd Parks
Guitar: Eric Lamont, Robbie Shakespeare, Lennox Gordon
Keyboards: Franklyn "Bubbler" Waul, Errol Nelson, Harold Butler
Alto Saxophone: Herman Marquis
Trombone: Vin Gordon
Tenor Saxophone: Tommy McCook
Trumpet: Bobby Ellis
Percussion: Uziah "Sticky" Thompson
Errol Thompson - arranger

References

External links

1978 albums
Dennis Brown albums